Giovanni Valentini (c. 1750 – 1804) was an Italian classical era composer, poet and painter. He is best remembered for his innovative instrumental music. Among his many works are two operas, La statua matematica and Le nozze in contrasto, the latter of which premiered at the Teatro San Moisè, Venice, in November 1774.

References

1750s births
1804 deaths
Italian Classical-period composers
Italian male classical composers
Italian opera composers
Male opera composers
19th-century Italian male musicians